Sphenodesme pierrei is the accepted name of a species of small liana in the genus Sphenodesme (family Lamiaceae). 
This species is found in southern Vietnam, where it may be called bội tinh Pierre.

References

External links

Lamiaceae
Flora of Vietnam